The British Rail Class 120 was a cross-country DMU in three-car formation, built at the British Rail Swindon Works.

History
Totalling 194 cars, three batches were built:
1958 - 49 sets for the Western Region
1959 - 7 sets for the Scottish Region
1961 - a further 9 sets for the Western Region

British Railways placed the order with British United Traction in summer 1956 for the equipment required for the 98 power cars and 47 trailers of the first batch. The order, along with equipment ordered by Cravens for 66 power cars and the 3 parcels cars, was valued at £830,000. The first batch was ordered for the WR's West Country dieselisation scheme, which it hoped to complete by the end of 1959. The sets were expected to work between Bristol & South Devon. Their general reliability and good braking characteristics made them popular with drivers.

In February 1959, the BTC placed an order with BUT for the equipment for the seven ScR sets, along with equipment for Class 108s and 127s being built at Derby. These 120s were to work mainly on the Aberdeen to Inverness line although appearances at Oban were not unknown. Otherwise the cars worked mainly in the Western and Midland Regions.

Some cars had a trial refurbishment but this was found to be too expensive, meaning an early withdrawal for most of the class. Some of the London Midland Region's units were transferred to Scotland in the mid-1980s, mainly finding use on local services from Edinburgh (notably to North Berwick). The final vehicles survived until 1989.

Fleet details

Operation
From first introduction, units were based at Laira and operated several services in Cornwall including the Truro and Newquay Railway route via Perranporth.

Accidents and incidents
On 12 May 1978, the unit containing 51793-59684-51794, struck a lorry at Oyne and the front two cars were derailed. The unit was on the 07:43 Aberdeen to Inverness. Out of the 54 passengers on board, only 5 people suffered minor injuries.

Other technical details
Coupling Code: Blue Square
Transmission: Standard mechanical

Preservation
One trailer car survives at the Great Central Railway: 59276 (TSLRB).

References

Sources

External links

The Railcar Association – History of the Class 120 DMUs
Picture of Class120

120
Train-related introductions in 1958